This list includes properties and districts listed on the California Historical Landmark listing in Amador County, California. Click the "Map of all coordinates" link to the right to view a Google map of all properties and districts with latitude and longitude coordinates in the table below.

|}

References

See also
National Register of Historic Places listings in Amador County, California
List of California Historical Landmarks

  

 
·CHL
List of California Historical Landmarks
Buildings and structures in Amador County, California
H01